Sérgio Danilas (born 30 May 1952) is a Brazilian volleyball player. He competed in the men's tournament at the 1976 Summer Olympics.

References

External links
 

1952 births
Living people
Brazilian men's volleyball players
Olympic volleyball players of Brazil
Volleyball players at the 1976 Summer Olympics
Place of birth missing (living people)
Pan American Games medalists in volleyball
Pan American Games silver medalists for Brazil
Medalists at the 1975 Pan American Games